The 2022–23 Winthrop Eagles men's basketball team represented Winthrop University in the 2022–23 NCAA Division I men's basketball season. The Eagles, led by second-year head coach Mark Prosser, played their home games at the Winthrop Coliseum in Rock Hill, South Carolina as members of the Big South Conference.

Previous season
The Eagles finished the 2021–22 season 23–9, 14–2 in Big South play to finish as Big South South Division champions. As the No. 2 seed in the Big South tournament, they defeated High Point and Gardner–Webb, before falling to Longwood in the championship game.

Roster

Schedule and results

|-
!colspan=12 style=| Non-conference regular season

|-
!colspan=12 style=| Big South regular season

|-
!colspan=9 style=| Big South tournament

|-

Sources

References

Winthrop Eagles men's basketball seasons
Winthrop Eagles
Winthrop Eagles men's basketball
Winthrop Eagles men's basketball